Ceromitia chalcocapna is a moth of the  family Adelidae or fairy longhorn moths. It is found in Congo.

References

Moths described in 1933
Adelidae